The 2009–10 Milwaukee Bucks season was the 42nd season of the franchise in the National Basketball Association (NBA).

The Bucks made the playoffs for the first time in four seasons, though they would lose in the First Round to the Atlanta Hawks in seven games after three games to two lead they lost the final two games of the playoff series. It was during this season in which the slogan "Fear the Deer" was coined, which the fans adopted onto the Internet. Five years after it was introduced, the Bucks used the slogan as part of their new jersey design and on the sidelines of the court. The team's also used the phrase as their official Twitter hashtag since 2018. The phrase was also engraved onto the Bucks' 2021 NBA Championship rings.

The 46-win total was the most games the Bucks had won since 2001 and the most they would win until 2019.

Key dates
 June 25 – The 2009 NBA draft took place in New York City.
 July 8 – The free agency period started.

Draft picks

Roster

Regular season

Standings

Record vs. opponents

Game log

|- bgcolor="#ffcccc"
| 1
| October 30
| Philadelphia
| 
| Brandon Jennings, Michael Redd (17)
| Brandon Jennings (9)
| Brandon Jennings (9)
| Wachovia Center14,638
| 0-1
|- bgcolor="#bbffbb"
| 2
| October 31
| @ Detroit
| 
| Brandon Jennings (24)
| Luc Richard Mbah a Moute, Andrew Bogut (8)
| Hakim Warrick, Charlie Bell, Brandon Jennings, Michael Redd (3)
| Bradley Center15,095
| 1–1

|- bgcolor="#ffcccc"
| 3
| November 3
| @ Chicago
| 
| Brandon Jennings (25)
| Andrew Bogut (13)
| Carlos Delfino, Brandon Jennings (4)
| United Center19,789
| 1–2
|- bgcolor="#bbffbb"
| 4
| November 6
| @ Minnesota
| 
| Andrew Bogut (17)
| Andrew Bogut (10)
| Charlie Bell (5)
| Target Center13,758
| 2–2
|- bgcolor="#bbffbb"
| 5
| November 7
| New York
| 
| Andrew Bogut (22)
| Ersan İlyasova (13)
| Andrew Bogut, Ersan İlyasova, Luke Ridnour (4)
| Bradley Center15,486
| 3–2
|- bgcolor="#bbffbb"
| 6
| November 11
| Denver
| 
| Brandon Jennings (32)
| Andrew Bogut (10)
| Charlie Bell (5)
| Bradley Center12,987
| 4–2
|- bgcolor="bbffbb"
| 7
| November 14
| Golden State
| 
| Brandon Jennings (55)
| Luc Richard Mbah a Moute (12)
| Charlie Bell (6)
| Bradley Center14,978
| 5-2
|- bgcolor="#ffcccc"
| 8
| November 16
| Dallas
| 
| Brandon Jennings (25)
| Ersan İlyasova (12)
| Luke Ridnour (12)
| Bradley Center13,683
| 5-3
|- bgcolor="#bbffbb"
| 9
| November 18
| New Jersey
| 
| Carlos Delfino, Andrew Bogut (21)
| Andrew Bogut (11)
| Brandon Jennings (8)
| Bradley Center13,479
| 6-3
|- bgcolor="#bbffbb"
| 10
| November 20
| Charlotte
| 
| Brandon Jennings (29)
| Hakim Warrick (9)
| Brandon Jennings (7)
| Bradley Center15,578
| 7-3
|- bgcolor="#bbffbb"
| 11
| November 21
| @ Memphis
| 
| Brandon Jennings (26)
| Ersan İlyasova (12)
| Luke Ridnour (12)
| FedEx Forum11,209
| 8-3
|- bgcolor="#ffcccc"
| 12
| November 23
| @ San Antonio
| 
| Ersan İlyasova (20)
| Kurt Thomas (5)
| Brandon Jennings (7)
| AT&T Center17,677
| 8-4
|- bgcolor="#ffcccc"
| 13
| November 25
| @ New Orleans
| 
| Luke Ridnour (23)
| Hakim Warrick (10)
| Luke Ridnour (10)
| New Orleans Arena14,315
| 8-5
|- bgcolor="#ffcccc"
| 14
| November 27
| @ Oklahoma City
| 
| Hakim Warrick, Carlos Delfino (15)
| Ersan İlyasova (12)
| Luke Ridnour (4)
| Ford Center18,203
| 8-6
|- bgcolor="#ffcccc"
| 15
| November 28
| Orlando
| 
| Luke Ridnour, Ersan İlyasova (20)
| Ersan İlyasova (16)
| Luke Ridnour (6)
| Bradley Center16,128
| 8-7
|- bgcolor="#bbffbb"
| 16
| November 30
| Chicago
| 
| Andrew Bogut (22)
| Andrew Bogut (15)
| Brandon Jennings (8)
| Bradley Center 13,684
| 9-7

|- bgcolor="#ffcccc"
| 17
| December 2
| @ Washington
| 
| Luke Ridnour, Hakim Warrick (20)
| Carlos Delfino (8)
| Brandon Jennings (7)
| Verizon Center12,272
| 9-8
|- bgcolor="#ffcccc"
| 18
| December 4
| @ Detroit
| 
| Luke Ridnour (21)
| Carlos Delfino (7)
| Luke Ridnour (9)
| The Palace of Auburn Hills16,557
| 9-9
|- bgcolor="#ffcccc"
| 19
| December 6
| Cleveland
| 
| Brandon Jennings (24)
| Hakim Warrick, Ersan İlyasova (9)
| Brandon Jennings (4)
| Bradley Center16,625
| 9-10
|- bgcolor="#ffcccc"
| 20
| December 8
| @ Boston
| 
| Andrew Bogut (25)
| Andrew Bogut (14)
| Andrew Bogut, Carlos Delfino (5)
| TD Garden18,624
| 9-11
|- bgcolor="#bbffbb"
| 21
| December 9
| Toronto
| 
| Brandon Jennings (22)
| Ersan İlyasova (9)
| Brandon Jennings, Luke Ridnour (7)
| Bradley Center12,637
| 10-11
|- bgcolor="#bbffbb"
| 22
| December 12
| Portland
| 
| Andrew Bogut (27)
| Andrew Bogut (9)
| Brandon Jennings (11)
| Bradley Center15,973
| 11-11
|- bgcolor="#ffcccc"
| 23
| December 16
| LA Lakers
| 
| Michael Redd (25)
| Andrew Bogut (12)
| Brandon Jennings (7)
| Bradley Center16,309
| 11-12
|- bgcolor="#ffcccc"
| 24
| December 18
| @ Cleveland
| 
| Ersan İlyasova, Brandon Jennings (18)
| Andrew Bogut (8)
| Brandon Jennings (8)
| Quicken Loans Arena20,562
| 11-13
|- bgcolor="#ffcccc"
| 25
| December 19
| Sacramento
| 
| Carlos Delfino (17)
| Andrew Bogut (13)
| Brandon Jennings (9)
| Bradley Center13,745
| 11-14
|- bgcolor="#bbffbb"
| 26
| December 21
| @ Indiana
| 
| Andrew Bogut (31)
| Andrew Bogut (18)
| Brandon Jennings (6)
| Conseco Fieldhouse12,836
| 12-14
|- bgcolor="#ffcccc"
| 27
| December 23
| Washington
| 
| Michael Redd (32)
| Andrew Bogut (9)
| Michael Redd, Luc Richard Mbah a Moute, Carlos Delfino, Jodie Meeks (3)
| Bradley Center13,113
| 12-15
|- bgcolor="#ffcccc"
| 28
| December 26
| San Antonio
| 
| Hakim Warrick (23)
| Andrew Bogut (8)
| Brandon Jennings (8)
| Bradley Center14,864
| 12-16
|- bgcolor="#ffcccc"
| 29
| December 28
| @ Charlotte
| 
| Brandon Jennings (24)
| Luc Richard Mbah a Moute (10)
| Brandon Jennings (7)
| Time Warner Cable Arena15,473
| 12-17
|- bgcolor="#ffcccc"
| 30
| December 30
| @ Orlando
| 
| Brandon Jennings (20)
| Andrew Bogut (10)
| Brandon Jennings (4)
| Amway Arena17,461
| 12-18

|- bgcolor="#bbffbb"
| 31
| January 2
| Oklahoma City
| 
| Michael Redd (27)
| Andrew Bogut (15)
| Brandon Jennings (5)
| Bradley Center15,264
| 13-18
|- bgcolor="#bbffbb"
| 32
| January 5
| @ New Jersey
| 
| Andrew Bogut (18)
| Luc Richard Mbah a Moute, Kurt Thomas (9)
| Luke Ridnour (5)
| IZOD Center11,101
| 14-18
|- bgcolor="#bbffbb"
| 33
| January 8
| Chicago
|  
| Andrew Bogut (27)
| Andrew Bogut (13)
| Brandon Jennings (8)
| Bradley Center18,717
| 15-18
|- bgcolor="#ffcccc"
| 34
| January 10
| @ LA Lakers
| 
| Hakim Warrick (14)
| Andrew Bogut (11)
| Luke Ridnour (6)
| Staples Center18,997
| 15-19
|- bgcolor="#ffcccc"
| 35
| January 11
| @ Phoenix
| 
| Hakim Warrick (21)
| Andrew Bogut (13)
| Brandon Jennings (8)
| US Airways Center15,116
| 15-20
|- bgcolor="#ffcccc"
| 36
| January 13
| @ Portland
| 
| Ersan İlyasova (24)
| Andrew Bogut (11)
| Luke Ridnour (8)
| Rose Garden20,465
| 15-21
|- bgcolor="#bbffbb"
| 37
| January 15
| @ Golden State
| 
| Brandon Jennings (25)
| Andrew Bogut (16)
| Luke Ridnour (8)
| Oracle Arena17,455
| 16-21
|- bgcolor="#ffcccc"
| 38
| January 16
| @ Utah
| 
| Carlos Delfino (28)
| Ersan İlyasova, Andrew Bogut (11)
| Brandon Jennings (11)
| EnergySolutions Arena19,669
| 16-22
|- bgcolor="#ffcccc"
| 39
| January 18
| @ Houston
| 
| Brandon Jennings (25)
| Andrew Bogut (17)
| Brandon Jennings (7)
| Toyota Center17,187
| 16-23
|- bgcolor="#bbffbb"
| 40
| January 20
| Toronto
| 
| Andrew Bogut (27)
| Andrew Bogut (12)
| Brandon Jennings (6)
| Bradley Center12,724
| 17-23
|- bgcolor="#ffcccc"
| 41
| January 22
| @ Toronto
| 
| Luke Ridnour (27)
| Carlos Delfino (11)
| Luke Ridnour (4)
| Air Canada Centre17,819
| 17-24
|- bgcolor="#bbffbb"
| 42
| January 23
| Minnesota
| 
| Carlos Delfino (24)
| Carlos Delfino (8), Ersan İlyasova (8)
| Brandon Jennings (13)
| Bradley Center17,742
| 18-24
|- bgcolor="#ffcccc"
| 43
| January 26
| @ Dallas
| 
| Andrew Bogut (32)
| Andrew Bogut (9)
| Brandon Jennings (7)
| American Airlines Center19,799
| 18-25
|- bgcolor="#bbffbb"
| 44
| January 27
| Philadelphia
| 
| Brandon Jennings (18), Charlie Bell (18)
| Andrew Bogut (9)
| Brandon Jennings (7)
| Bradley Center12,685
| 19-25
|- bgcolor="#bbffbb"
| 45
| January 30
| Miami
| 
| Hakim Warrick (22)
| Andrew Bogut (15)
| Andrew Bogut (5)
| Bradley Center18,717
| 20-25

|- bgcolor="#bbffbb"
| 46
| February 1
| @ Miami
| 
| Andrew Bogut (22)
| Andrew Bogut (11)
| Andrew Bogut (8)
| American Airlines Arena15,858
| 21-25
|- bgcolor="#ffcccc"
| 47
| February 2
| @ Orlando
| 
| Luke Ridnour (13), Charlie Bell (13)
| Andrew Bogut (10)
| Brandon Jennings (4), Luke Ridnour (4)
| Amway Arena17,461
| 21-26
|- bgcolor="#bbffbb"
| 48
| February 5
| @ New York
| 
| Ersan İlyasova (25)
| Ersan İlyasova (9), Carlos Delfino (9)
| Brandon Jennings (8)
| Madison Square Garden19,274
| 22-26
|- bgcolor="#bbffbb"
| 49
| February 6
| Indiana
| 
| Andrew Bogut (21)
| Luc Mbah a Moute (11)
| Brandon Jennings (7)
| Bradley Center
| 23-26
|- bgcolor="#ffcccc"
| 50
| February 9
| Detroit
| 
| Brandon Jennings (18)
| Andrew Bogut (18)
| Brandon Jennings (5)
| Bradley Center12,724
| 23-27
|- bgcolor="#bbffbb"
| 51
| February 10
| @ New Jersey
| 
| Andrew Bogut (22)
| Luc Mbah a Moute (12)
| Luke Ridnour (8)
| Izod Center12,724
| 24-27
|- bgcolor="#ffcccc"
| 52
| February 17
| Houston
| 
| Luc Mbah a Moute (18)
| Luc Mbah a Moute (8), Carlos Delfino (8)
| Luke Ridnour (6)
| Bradley Center12,724
| 24-28
|- bgcolor="#bbffbb"
| 53
| February 19
| @ Detroit
| 
| John Salmons (19)
| Andrew Bogut (12), Ersan İlyasova (12)
| Carlos Delfino (6)
| The Palace of Auburn Hills12,724
| 25-28
|- bgcolor="#bbffbb"
| 54
| February 20
| Charlotte
| 
| Brandon Jennings (19), John Salmons (19)
| Andrew Bogut (13)
| John Salmons (7)
| Bradley Center12,724
| 26-28
|- bgcolor="#bbffbb"
| 55
| February 22
| @ New York
| 
| Andrew Bogut (24)
| Andrew Bogut (20)
| Brandon Jennings (7)
| Madison Square Garden12,724
| 27-28
|- bgcolor="#bbffbb"
| 56
| February 24
| New Orleans
| 
| Andrew Bogut (26)
| Andrew Bogut (13)
| Luke Ridnour (6)
| Bradley Center12,724
| 28-28
|- bgcolor="#bbffbb"
| 57
| February 25
| @ Indiana
| 
| John Salmons (20)
| Andrew Bogut (10)
| Luke Ridnour (8)
| Conseco Fieldhouse12,724
| 29-28
|- bgcolor="#bbffbb"
| 58
| February 27
| @ Miami
| 
| John Salmons (18)
| Andrew Bogut (10)
| Brandon Jennings (8)
| American Airlines Arena18,883
| 30-28
|- bgcolor="#ffcccc"
| 59
| February 28
| @ Atlanta
| 
| John Salmons (32)
| Andrew Bogut (9)
| Brandon Jennings (5)
| Philips Arena16,381
| 30-29

|- bgcolor="#bbffbb"
| 60
| March 3
| Washington
| 
| John Salmons (22)
| Carlos Delfino (11)
| Luke Ridnour (6), Ersan İlyasova (6)
| Bradley Center13,247
| 31-29
|- bgcolor="#bbffbb"
| 61
| March 5
| @ Washington
| 
| Andrew Bogut (19), Carlos Delfino (19)
| Andrew Bogut (10)
| Brandon Jennings (9)
| Verizon Center16,963
| 32-29
|- bgcolor="#bbffbb"
| 62
| March 6
| Cleveland
| 
| Brandon Jennings (25)
| Carlos Delfino (13)
| Brandon Jennings (6)
| Bradley Center18,717
| 33-29
|- bgcolor="#bbffbb"
| 63
| March 9
| Boston
| 
| Andrew Bogut (25)
| Andrew Bogut (17)
| Brandon Jennings (4), John Salmons (4)
| Bradley Center14,316
| 34-29
|- bgcolor="#bbffbb"
| 64
| March 12
| Utah
| 
| John Salmons (24)
| Andrew Bogut (12)
| Carlos Delfino (8)
| Bradley Center14,917
| 35-29
|- bgcolor="#bbffbb"
| 65
| March 14
| Indiana
| 
| Jerry Stackhouse (20)
| Andrew Bogut (11)
| Brandon Jennings (8)
| Bradley Center15,107
| 36-29
|- bgcolor="#ffcccc"
| 66
| March 17
| @ LA Clippers
| 
| Brandon Jennings (21)
| Andrew Bogut (11)
| Brandon Jennings (5)
| Staples Center15,241
| 36-30
|- bgcolor="#bbffbb"
| 67
| March 19
| @ Sacramento
| 
| Brandon Jennings (35)
| Andrew Bogut (11), Ersan İlyasova (11)
| Brandon Jennings (8)
| ARCO Arena12,098
| 37-30
|- bgcolor="#bbffbb"
| 68
| March 20
| @ Denver
| 
| Carlos Delfino (26)
| Ersan İlyasova (10)
| Brandon Jennings (4), John Salmons (4)
| Pepsi Center19,390
| 38-30
|- bgcolor="#bbffbb"
| 69
| March 22
| Atlanta
| 
| John Salmons (32)
| Andrew Bogut (11)
| Luke Ridnour (8)
| Bradley Center14,186
| 39-30
|- bgcolor="#ffcccc"
| 70
| March 24
| Philadelphia
| 
| Jerry Stackhouse (15)
| Ersan İlyasova (11)
| Luke Ridnour (4)
| Bradley Center12,675
| 39-31
|- bgcolor="#ffcccc"
| 71
| March 26
| Miami
| 
| John Salmons (23)
| Luc Richard Mbah a Moute (11)
| Brandon Jennings (2), Luc Richard Mbah a Moute (2), Kurt Thomas (2)
| Bradley Center17,841
| 39-32
|- bgcolor="#bbffbb"
| 72
| March 28
| Memphis
| 
| Brandon Jennings (29)
| Andrew Bogut (11)
| Brandon Jennings (8)
| Bradley Center17,008
| 40-32
|- bgcolor="#bbffbb"
| 73
| March 30
| LA Clippers
| 
| Ersan İlyasova (20)
| Kurt Thomas (9) 
| Brandon Jennings (6)
| Bradley Center12,724
| 41-32
|- bgcolor="#ffcccc"
| 74
| March 31
| @ Cleveland
| 
| John Salmons (28)
| Andrew Bogut (12)
| Brandon Jennings (11)
| Quicken Loans Arena12,724
| 41-33

|- bgcolor="#ffcccc"
| 75
| April 2
| @ Charlotte
| 
| John Salmons (28)
| Andrew Bogut (12)
| Brandon Jennings (5)
| Time Warner Cable Arena12,724
| 41-34
|- bgcolor="#bbffbb"
| 76
| April 3
| Phoenix
| 
| Brandon Jennings (23)
| Carlos Delfino (9)
| Luke Ridnour (6)
| Bradley Center12,724
| 42-34
|- bgcolor="#bbffbb"
| 77
| April 6
| @ Chicago
| 
| John Salmons (26)
| Kurt Thomas (14)
| Brandon Jennings (8)
| United Center12,724
| 43-34
|- bgcolor="#bbffbb"
| 78
| April 7
| New Jersey
| 
| Devin Harris (25)
| Yi Jianlian (8)
| Brook Lopez (7)
| Bradley Center16,037
| 44-34
|- bgcolor="#bbffbb"
| 79
| April 9
| @ Philadelphia
| 
| Carlos Delfino (23)
| Ersan İlyasova, Luc Richard Mbah a Moute (9)
| Andrew Bogut (7)
| Oracle Arena14,217
| 45-34
|- bgcolor="#ffcccc"
| 80
| April 10
| Boston
| 
| John Salmons (21)
| Kurt Thomas (10)
| John Salmons (4)
| Bradley Center18,717
| 45-35
|- bgcolor="#ffcccc"
| 81
| April 12
| Atlanta
| 
| John Salmons (28)
| Kurt Thomas (10)
| Brandon Jennings, Luke Ridnour (5)
| Bradley Center14,186
| 45-36
|- bgcolor="#bbffbb"

| 82
| April 14
| @ Boston
| 
| Luke Ridnour, Jerry Stackhouse (17)
| Dan Gadzuric (9)
| Luke Ridnour (8)
| TD Banknorth Garden18,624
| 46-36

Playoffs

Game log

|- bgcolor="#ffcccc"
| 1
| April 17
| @ Atlanta
| 
| Brandon Jennings (34)
| Kurt Thomas (9)
| Brandon Jennings (3)
| Philips Arena18,729
| 0–1
|- bgcolor="#ffcccc"
| 2
| April 20
| @ Atlanta
| 
| John Salmons (21)
| Ersan İlyasova (15)
| Carlos Delfino, John Salmons (4)
| Philips Arena18,938
| 0–2
|- bgcolor="#bbffbb"
| 3
| April 24
| Atlanta
| 
| John Salmons (22)
| Kurt Thomas (13)
| John Salmons (7)
| Bradley Center18,717
| 1–2
|- bgcolor="#bbffbb"
| 4
| April 26
| Atlanta
| 
| Brandon Jennings (23)
| Kurt Thomas (9)
| Brandon Jennings (6)
| Bradley Center18,717
| 2–2
|- bgcolor="#bbffbb"
| 5
| April 28
| @ Atlanta
| 
| Brandon Jennings (25)
| Ersan İlyasova (7)
| John Salmons (5)
| Philips Arena19,304
| 3–2
|- bgcolor="#ffcccc"
| 6
| April 30
| Atlanta
| 
| Carlos Delfino (20)
| Kurt Thomas (9)
| John Salmons (4)
| Bradley Center18,717
| 3–3
|- bgcolor="#ffcccc"
| 7
| May 2
| @ Atlanta
| 
| Brandon Jennings (15)
| Ersan İlyasova (11)
| Brandon Jennings (5)
| Philips Arena19,241
| 3–4

Player statistics

Season

1Stats with the Bucks.

Playoffs

Awards, records and milestones

Awards

Week/Month

All-Star
 Brandon Jennings Represented the Bucks in the Skills Challenge in which he came in 3rd, and
he participated in the Rookie/Sophomore Challenge as well.

Season

Records
 Most Points by a Bucks Rookie (55 by Brandon Jennings)

Milestones

Injuries and surgeries
 Andrew Bogut – Broken right hand
 Michael Redd – Torn ACL

Transactions

Trades

Free agents

|}

References

External links
 2009–10 Milwaukee Bucks season at ESPN

Milwaukee Bucks seasons
Milwaukee
Milwaukee Bucks
Milwaukee Bucks